Eren Holding is a conglomerate headquartered in Istanbul, Turkey. It has business interests in paper, packaging, cement, energy, retail and textiles. The holding company was established in 1997 although the history of the group dates back to 1969.

Eren Holding's chairman is Ahmet Eren. The group employs 10,000 employees.

Due to its coal-fired power stations Eren is one of the largest private sector greenhouse gas emitters in Turkey.

History
Eren was established by four brothers from Bitlis. In 1969, Er-os Çamaşırları A.Ş., an underwear manufacturer and trademark was established. In 1998, Eren Holding entered the energy sector with Modern Enerji Elektrik Üretim Otoprodüktör Grubu A.Ş. In 2003, the Rixos Hotel Bodrum was put into service in Bodrum, Turkey, marking the company's entry into the tourism industry. In 2007, Eren Enerji started construction of a 1360 MW coal-fired power plant in Zonguldak, which was completed in 2010. In 2012, Eren Perakende created the multi-brand shoe concept SuperStep stores and multi-brand kids store chain SuperKids. In 2014, a 6 MW biomass power plant started operating. In 2015, Modern Enerji established the first solid waste incineration facility in Turkey. Also in 2015, Modern Karton completed construction of a new paper factory.

In 2019, Eren Enerji Elektrik Üretim A.Ş received a silver award at the industry and energy category of the Green World Awards. That was criticized by environmental organizations as greenwashing.

Operations
Eren Holding controls businesses across several sectors, including energy, paper, cement, retail, ports, packaging and textiles. It owns ports in Zonguldak and Mersin. Its subsidiaries Eren Kağıt and Modern Karton collect waste paper and recycle it into corrugated fiberboard.

Eren owns Turkey's biggest cement factory—Medcem Çimento—in Mersin. As local demand collapsed in 2019, the factory concentrates on exports.

ErenTekstil A.Ş. manufactures cotton textiles. Eren Perakende represent a number of international brands in Turkey, including Lacoste, Burberry, GANT, Nautica and Converse. In addition to its physical stores, it sells online through Occasion, Sanal Çadır, SuperStep and FashFed  e-commerce sites. 

Eren Holding's subsidiary Eren Energy owns the coal-fired ZETES power stations. Another energy subsidiary, Modern Energy, owns a solid waste incineration facility and natural gas-fired and biomass-fired power plants in Çorlu.

Greenhouse gas emissions 

Due to its cement factory in Silifke, coal-fired power stations and coal-fired steam boiler Eren is one of the largest private sector greenhouse gas emitters in Turkey. As the largest private sector owner of coal-fired electricity generating capacity in Turkey the company is on the Global Coal Exit List, and is one of the largest greenhouse gas emitters in the country: however although corporate emissions measurements are reported to the government they are not published. Climate Trace estimates Eren Energy’s coal-fired power plants emitted 15 million tons (2.7%) of the country’s total 560 million tons of greenhouse gas in 2021.

References

Sources

External links

 "Eren Enerji" article Global Energy Monitor

Conglomerate companies of Turkey
Holding companies of Turkey
Companies based in Istanbul
Energy companies established in 1969
Coal companies of Turkey
Electric power companies of Turkey
Turkish companies established in 1969
Holding companies established in 1969